Rudolf Rickenbacher (born 5 December 1934) is a Swiss former footballer who played in the 1950s and early 1960s. He played as midfielder. 

Rickenbacher first played for FC Nordstern Basel in the Nationalliga B, the second tier of Swiss football. He joined FC Basel's first team in their 1955–56 season under trainer Béla Sárosi. After playing in one test match, Rickenbacher played his domestic league debut for his new club in the away game on 20 May 1956 as Basel played a goalless draw with Lugano.

After two seasons with Basel, Rickenbacher moved on to play one season with La Chaux-de-Fonds, but returned to Basel there after.

Between the years 1955 to 1957 and again from 1958 to 1961 Rickenbacher played a total of 87 games for Basel without scoring a goal. 48 of these games were in the Nationalliga A, four in the Swiss Cup, three in the International Football Cup and 32 were friendly games.

References

Sources
 Die ersten 125 Jahre. Publisher: Josef Zindel im Friedrich Reinhardt Verlag, Basel. 
 Verein "Basler Fussballarchiv" Homepage

FC Basel players
FC Nordstern Basel players
FC La Chaux-de-Fonds players
Swiss men's footballers
Association football midfielders
1934 births
Living people